Eriastrum wilcoxii is a species of flowering plant in the phlox family known by the common name Wilcox's woollystar. It is native to the western United States, where it grows in various types of desert and plateau habitat. It is an annual herb producing a thin, branching, usually woolly stem up to about 30 centimeters tall. The leaves are narrow and thready, up to 3 centimeters long, and sometimes divided into two or more lobes. The inflorescence is a woolly cluster of narrow, leaflike bracts laced with webby fibers. The small flowers have yellow throats and blue corollas with lobes up to half a centimeter long.

References

External links
Jepson Manual Treatment
Photo gallery

wilcoxii
Flora of the Western United States
Flora without expected TNC conservation status